David Levy (born 21 December 1937) is an Israeli politician who served as a member of the Knesset between 1969 and 2006, as well as Deputy Prime Minister, Minister of Foreign Affairs, Minister of Immigrant Absorption, Minister of Housing and Construction and as a Minister without Portfolio. Although most of his time as a Knesset member was spent with Likud, he also led the breakaway Gesher faction, which formed part of Ehud Barak's Labor-led government between 1999 and 2001.

Biography
David Levy was born in Rabat, Morocco. He immigrated to Israel in 1957. His first jobs in Israel were planting trees for the Jewish National Fund and picking cotton on a kibbutz, where he organized a strike to protest the quality of drinking water for the workers. He went on to become a leader of Beit She'an's working-class population. As a union activist, he campaigned for membership in the Histadrut Labour Federation's executive body, which was dominated by loyalists of the governing Mapai. Levy headed the opposition Blue-White faction.

David Levy is married and the father of twelve children, including politician Orly Levy.

Political career
Until 1973 Likud had been an alliance of the right-wing Herut and centrist Liberal parties known as Gahal, which had never had an active role in governing Israel and had always been a weak opposition. Levy distinguished himself as the first of many young working-class members of the party from a Mizrahi (Oriental) background. Until then Herut and the Liberals had been both dominated by right-wing upper-class or upper-middle-class intellectuals, businessmen, agriculturalists, or lawyers.

Levy's rise expressed the surging power of the new rebellion of the Mizrahi Israeli. In 1977, Levy became one of the most strident campaigners in Likud leader Menachem Begin's triumphant campaign that overturned the 30-year domination of Israeli elections by parties of the left. He drove hundreds of thousands of Mizrahi voters to the polls to vote for Begin, whose populist messages struck a chord in their hearts after the three decades of almost completely Ashkenazic Mapai hegemony.

Ministerial positions

From 1977 until 1981, Levy was Minister of Immigrant Absorption in the first two Begin governments. At this time the largest issues he dealt with during his tenure in that ministry were the campaign to liberate Soviet Jews confined to the USSR, and the controversy over the Beta Israel, a group from Ethiopia that had still not received total recognition as Jews at that time.

Levy's more important role in government began during the formation of Begin's rightist government when the Democratic Movement for Change resigned. On 15 January 1979 he was given the Ministry of Housing and Construction, a post he invested a great deal of time in. Levy held the ministry until 1990, and his policies are controversial for their repeated concessions to the settler movements, which the opposition Labour Party branded pure politicking.

As Housing Minister Levy was able to make housing more affordable (radical inflation in 1984 produced a crisis as property and rent values plummeted along with the Israeli shekels). While rival Likud members like Defence Minister Ariel Sharon and Health Minister Ehud Olmert were hit by controversies regarding abuse of their positions, and repeated finance ministers fell, Levy remained stable in the Housing Ministry. Through the governments of Begin, Yitzhak Shamir, and Shimon Peres he remained untouchable.

Levy was the symbolic leader of the young Mizrahi Likud leaders that included former Kiryat Malakhi mayor Moshe Katzav, later President of Israel, and David Magen, mayor of neighbouring Kiryat Gat. In the Likud Central Committee, Levy commanded a huge portion of the members, and was considered a true candidate to succeed Shamir.

In 1987, he met Benjamin Netanyahu, then the Israeli ambassador to the United Nations.  Levy viewed Netanyahu as a potential spokesman for him in the Knesset, as he was viewed as a master at rhetoric and debating during his career as a diplomat.

Netanyahu turned down Levy's offer and became a nominal ally of then-Defense Minister Moshe Arens (his former boss when Arens was Ambassador to the United States in the early 1980s). Levy's career was harmed by his perceived pompousnessand shifting policies in regards to the peace process. Levy, who speaks Hebrew, French, and Moroccan Arabic, was not fluent in English, which became an impediment in talks with the Americans.

Levy's candidacy was supposed to rejuvenate the Likud's Mizrahi voting base, and form a hawkish working class opposition to Labour. Levy's policies on the peace question was moderate relative to Ariel Sharon, Moshe Arens, and almost all other senior Likud figures.

Again he ran parallel to Benjamin Netanyahu. At that time, right-wing Israelis were launching a long opposition plan to the new prime minister, Yitzhak Rabin (Labour). Netanyahu took a hard-line stand, describing a doomsday scenario of terror at the doorstep of every Israeli. Levy refused to accept Netanyahu as the new Likud chairman. The result was the establishment of Gesher ("Bridge"), Levy's own political party. Levy believed he could draw a mass defection from the Likud of parliament members, and such a disaster would lead senior party members in the Central Committee into a panic that would topple Benjamin Netanyahu. What instead occurred was that only David Magen, a Moroccan politician and former mayor of Kiryat Gat who served as Minister of Economics and Planning in the last Shamir government, broke with the Likud. Though many of Gesher's members were derided by the press as lackeys of Levy, Magen later broke with Levy to join the Center Party in 1998 (then known as "Israel in the Center").

By Winter 1996, Levy was beginning to break under the stress of his first election campaign outside of the Likud. Since the 4 November 1995 murder of Rabin, Netanyahu was frantically trying to moderate his image from a hard-line demagogue into a skeptic who wanted to slow the pace of concessions to PLO leader Yasser Arafat. Levy's inclusion would somewhat bring him closer to that goal without forcing him to take a clear stand in favour of the Oslo Accords. The opposition leader was trying to bridge the gap by recruiting the hard-line Tzomet ("Junction") party of Gen. Rafael Eitan on the right, as well as the moderate right-wing Gen. Yitzhak Mordechai in the center.

Throughout the spring, Netanyahu and Levy held negotiations, and in the end Levy agreed to establish Likud–Gesher–Tzomet, a joint three-party list for the May 1996 elections. Though the broad-based coalition at the end of the outgoing Knesset included 37 members (three Tzomet members defected earlier to join Rabin's government) even threatened Labour, which had lost two members to Avigdor Kahalani's The Third Way, a group opposed to any compromise on the Golan Heights.

Though a massive success for Netanyahu, the 1996 elections gained little for Levy in terms of power within Likud–Gesher–Tzomet. The real no. 2 leader in the Likud was now Mordechai, and the right-wing character of the government was clear from the start. Levy also demanded the Foreign Ministry, which he received, even without being blunted by a deputy. He believed that this way he could remain totally in control of the ministry, but instead he was again overshadowed by Netanyahu, who controlled almost every important foreign policy decision during his term. David Magen was given the post of Deputy Minister of Finance, under Prof. Yuval Ne'eman.

The Bar-On Affair, an attempt to alter the investigation of Shas leader Aryeh Deri, created tension amongst the partners. On 6 January 1998 David Levy quit the coalition along with former ambassador to France and Channel 2 chairman Yehuda Lancry and his brother and former Lod mayor Maxim. Gesher was once again totally independent, and Levy drifted closer to the policies of the Labour Party and opposition leader Ehud Barak.

Levy merged Gesher into One Israel, and became a partner in the new coalition's leadership. With the new system of direct election of the prime minister, and a separate election of the Knesset, the number of parties elected to the body increased markedly in 1999 from eleven to fifteen, and the number would only grow as parties subdivided due to political tensions. The winning faction, One Israel, took only 26 seats, a record low for a governing party, though Barak won 56% of the direct vote for prime minister. Netanyahu's Likud was crushed as expected, winning only 19 seats and leading to his immediate resignation from the Knesset and public life.

Levy once again was chosen to be foreign minister, with his deputy being Nawaf Mazalha (One Israel), an Arab Israeli. Levy was for the third time a passive partner as foreign minister. He quit the coalition in April 2000 in response to Barak's attempts to move peace negotiations forward and in protest to the announced plan to withdraw Israeli military forces from Lebanon.

Levy was the first minister in Barak's government to resign when his demands were not met. He reformed Gesher along with Maxim Levy and rookie legislator Mordechai Mishani. In February 2002 One Nation quit Sharon's government to protest his economic policies. Their leader, Histadrut Labour Federation chairman Amir Peretz. Levy's position for the elections for the 16th Knesset was precarious. Levy left Gesher and moved back to the Likud. Etty (Estee) Shiraz, the party's head of communications at that time, was elected as the head of Gesher instead of David Levy, and led Gesher in the elections to the 16th Knesset. Levy and his supporters objected in the petition to prevent Shiraz and the rest of Gesher members from continuing the party's activity, and asked to dissolve the party and relate to his move as a merge of his political party in its entirety. The struggle continued years later, while Shiraz and other members of the party are trying to rebuild Gesher and transform it into a modern social party appealing to Israel's young generation of academics and professionals, and David Levy and his supporters seeking to dismantle it.

Levy was elected as a member of the 16th Knesset but did not get a realistic place on the Likud list in the election to the 17th Knesset and disappeared from the political arena. Following the Kadima split, Levy failed to acquire a high position on Likud's Knesset list, and as a result of this lost his seat at the 2006 election.

Awards and recognition
In 2018, David Levy won the Israel Prize for lifetime achievement.

See also
1983 Herut leadership election
1992 Likud leadership election
1993 Likud leadership election

References

1937 births
Living people
People from Rabat
20th-century Moroccan Jews
Moroccan emigrants to Israel
Israeli Jews
Members of the 7th Knesset (1969–1974)
Members of the 8th Knesset (1974–1977)
Members of the 9th Knesset (1977–1981)
Members of the 10th Knesset (1981–1984)
Members of the 11th Knesset (1984–1988)
Members of the 12th Knesset (1988–1992)
Members of the 13th Knesset (1992–1996)
Members of the 14th Knesset (1996–1999)
Members of the 15th Knesset (1999–2003)
Members of the 16th Knesset (2003–2006)
Gahal politicians
Likud politicians
Gesher (political party) politicians
Leaders of political parties in Israel
One Israel politicians
Ministers of Foreign Affairs of Israel
Ministers of Housing of Israel
People from Beit She'an